Herbert George Lucas (12 December 1921 – 26 April 1973) was an Australian rules footballer who played for the South Melbourne Football Club in the Victorian Football League (VFL).

At the end of the 1941 VFL season he enlisted to serve in the Australian Army, serving until the end of World War II.

Notes

External links 

1921 births
1973 deaths
Australian rules footballers from Melbourne
Sydney Swans players
Australian Army personnel of World War II
Australian Army soldiers
People from South Melbourne
Military personnel from Melbourne